Controne is a town and comune in the province of Salerno in the Campania region of south-western Italy.

History

In 2015 Mayor Nicola Pastore issued an ordinance stating that dogs are not permitted to bark between 2pm and 4pm, the period of Italian napping, and during evening hours.

Geography
The town is situated in the middle of Cilento, by the western side of the Alburni mountains, and its territory is part of the Cilento and Vallo di Diano National Park. The municipality has an area on 7 km2 and is bordered by Altavilla Silentina, Castelcivita and Postiglione. Lesser than 1 km in south of it are located the Castelcivita Caves, by the river Calore. Nearest places are Castelcivita and the village of Canneto, 4 km in the north.

Events
One of the most important events of the town is the sagra of the "Beans of Controne", held each November from 1983.

Gallery

See also
Cilento
Cilentan dialect

References

External links

 Municipal site of Controne

Cities and towns in Campania
Localities of Cilento